American actress Whoopi Goldberg has received many awards and nominations for her film, television, and stage work. Having acted in over 150 films, Goldberg is one of the few people to achieve the EGOT, having won the four major American awards for professional entertainers: an Emmy (Television), a Grammy (Music), an Oscar (Film), and a Tony (Theater). 

Goldberg has received two Academy Award nominations, for The Color Purple and Ghost, winning for Ghost. She is the first African American to have received Academy Award nominations for both Best Actress and Best Supporting Actress. She has received three Golden Globe nominations, winning two (Best Actress in 1986 for The Color Purple, and Best Supporting Actress in 1991 for Ghost). For Ghost, she also won a BAFTA Award for Best Actress in a Supporting Role in 1991. In February 2002, Goldberg sent her Oscar statuette from Ghost to the Academy of Motion Picture Arts and Sciences to be cleaned and replated. During this time, the statuette was taken from its shipping container and later retrieved by the shipping company, UPS.

She won a Grammy Award for Best Comedy Recording in 1985 for "Whoopi Goldberg: Direct from Broadway," becoming only the second solo female performer—not part of a duo or team—at the time to receive the award, and the first African-American woman. Goldberg is one of only three single women performers to receive that award. She won a Tony Award in 2002 as a producer of the Broadway musical Thoroughly Modern Millie. She has received eight Daytime Emmy nominations, winning two. She has received nine Primetime Emmy nominations. In 2009, Goldberg won the Daytime Emmy Award for Outstanding Talk Show Host for her role on The View. She shared the award with her then co-hosts Joy Behar, Sherri Shepherd, Elisabeth Hasselbeck, and Barbara Walters.

EGOT awards

Academy Awards

Grammy Awards

Tony Awards

Primetime Emmy Awards

Daytime Emmy Awards

Film awards

British Academy Film Awards

Golden Globe Awards

Saturn Awards

Theatre awards

Drama Desk Awards

Outer Critics Circle Awards

Theatre World Award

Other

Audie Awards

 1993 – Hasty Pudding Woman of the Year

See also 
 Whoopi Goldberg filmography

References

External links
 
 

Goldberg, Whoopi